Shadow Tyrants is a novel by Clive Cussler and Boyd Morrison, first published September 11, 2018. It made it to The New York Times Best Seller list, topping out at the number two spot.  

Shadow Tyrants is book 13 in Cussler's The Oregon Files series.

Summary
Nearly two thousand years ago, an Eastern emperor charged a small group with safeguarding a body of knowledge and secrets powerful enough to change the history of mankind. They went down in legend as the Nine Unknown Men.

But now two rival factions of the descendants of the Nine Unknown Men are fighting a mighty battle. Both sides think they are saving the world, but one of them is willing to use horrifying means to accomplish its goals. It is up to Cabrillo and his team of expert operatives to stop both of them from the destructive path they are on, and save the earth from a dynasty of terror.

Reception
Critics are mixed, with Kirkus noting, "It’s not the strongest premise for a thriller" and "Readers probably won’t lie awake worrying whether all this could really happen"  and Publishers Weekly saying "There’s plenty of action, but the stale scenario and stock characters add up to a seen-it-before experience." Whereas the AP offered the praise, "Cussler and action-adventure fans will love this latest Oregon Files novel. New characters to the team are most welcome, and the sheer insanity of the story line will keep readers guessing about what's going on until the last page of the book."

Locations

 Camp Justice (Diego Garcia) renamed Camp Thunder Cove in July 2006 in the Indian Ocean.
 Limassol, Cyprus
 Pokhran Test Range, India
 Mumbai, India
 Red Sea

References

2018 American novels
Novels by Clive Cussler
American thriller novels
G. P. Putnam's Sons books
The Oregon Files
Collaborative novels